Tarlochan Singh Bawa (12 February 1923 – 24 April 2008) was an Indian field hockey player who competed (and won gold) in the 1948 London Olympics. His grandson Raj Bawa was one of the members of the winning team in the ICC Under-19 Cricket World Cup 2022.

External links
 
Obituary

1923 births
2008 deaths
Field hockey players from Punjab, India
Olympic field hockey players of India
Field hockey players at the 1948 Summer Olympics
Indian male field hockey players
Olympic gold medalists for India
Olympic medalists in field hockey
Medalists at the 1948 Summer Olympics
Field hockey players from Lahore